Serkan Karababa (born 18 December 1975) is a retired Turkish football defender.

References

1975 births
Living people
Turkish footballers
Bornovaspor footballers
Altay S.K. footballers
Samsunspor footballers
Diyarbakırspor footballers
Kayserispor footballers
Altınordu F.K. players
Association football defenders
Süper Lig players